The d rune (ᛞ) is called dæg "day" in the Anglo-Saxon rune poem. The corresponding letter of the Gothic alphabet 𐌳 d is called dags. This rune is also part of the Elder Futhark, with a reconstructed Proto-Germanic name *dagaz.

Its "butterfly" shape is possibly derived from Lepontic san.

Rune poems 
The name is only recorded in the Anglo-Saxon rune poem, since the rune was lost in the Younger Futhark:

Inscriptions
On runic inscription Ög 43 in Ingelstad, one Dagaz rune is translated using the Old Norse word for "day" as the personal name Dagr.

References

See also
Dagr

Runes